Eduardo Val Bescós (1906 in A Coruña – May 1, 1992 in Argentina) was a Galician anarcho-syndicalist. He took in Casado's coup of March 1939.

In later exile, he went to Argentina, where he continued his political activity, acting as a representative of the bakers' guild. He was prosecuted and sentenced to life imprisonment by the Special Tribunal for the Repression of Freemasonry and Communism.

References

Further reading 

 

People from Galicia (Spain)
1906 births
1992 deaths
Spanish anarchists
Spanish emigrants to Argentina